, often abbreviated to GanPro, is a Japanese professional wrestling promotion founded in 2013 as a sister promotion of DDT Pro-Wrestling. Although it originated as a special event by the parent company DDT, it has since become its own promotion. GanPro is promoted under the CyberFight banner as a sister promotion to DDT, Tokyo Joshi Pro Wrestling and Pro Wrestling Noah.

History
Ganbare☆Pro-Wrestling was created in 2013 by Ken Ohka as a brand of DDT Pro-Wrestling. The brand was created to capture the spirit of small independent promotions in Japan and, to do so, regularly brought in wrestlers from outside the promotion. In September 2021, GanPro revived the Ganbare☆Climax and created the Spirit of Ganbare World Openweight Championship as a prize for the winner of the tournament.

Roster

Wrestlers

Notable alumni/guests
Ayame Sasamura
Kazuhiko Ogasawara
Miku Aono
Rina Yamashita
Sawako Shimono
Totoro Satsuki

Championships

Current championships

Tournaments

References

External links

2013 establishments in Japan
Japanese professional wrestling promotions
CyberAgent
DDT Pro-Wrestling